An acolyte in its original religious definition is one who assists a higher-ranking member of a church or cult.

The word may also refer to:

In media
Acolyte or Acolytes may refer to:
 Acolytes (comics), a Marvel Comics team of mutant supervillains
 Acolytes (film), a 2008 Australian horror film directed by Jon Hewitt
 Acolyte (album), the 2010 debut album by UK band Delphic
 The Acolyte (novel), a novel by Thea Astley
 The Acolyte, a Hugo Award-nominated science fiction fanzine edited by Francis Towner Laney
The Acolyte, an upcoming live-action Star Wars streaming series
 Acolytes Protection Agency, a pro-wrestling tag team sometimes referred to as simply The Acolytes
Acolyte, a character in The Road to El Dorado as Tzekel-Kan's assistant 
 The Acolytes in The Pendragon Adventure, by D.J. MacHale

Video games
Acolyte is a character class, unit, or weapon in video games such as:
 Battle Realms
 Command & Conquer: Renegade
 Dark Ages (1999 video game)
 Destiny (video game)
 Disgaea 2
 Disgaea 3
 Homeworld: Cataclysm
 Mass Effect 3 
 MouseHunt (game)
 Ragnarok Online
 Warcraft III: Reign of Chaos
 World of Warcraft
 X-Men Legends
 Star Wars: The Force Unleashed II
 Star Wars: The Clone Wars (2002 video game)